NGC 694 is a spiral galaxy approximately 136 million light-years away from Earth in the constellation of Aries. It was discovered by German astronomer Heinrich Louis d'Arrest on December 2, 1861 with the 11-inch refractor at Copenhagen.

Nearby galaxies 
NGC 694 is a member of a small galaxy group known as the NGC 691 group, the main other members of which are NGC 680, NGC 691 and NGC 697. IC 167 lies 5.5 arcminutes to the south-southeast.

Supernova SN 2014bu 
Supernova SN 2014bu was discovered in NGC 694 on June 17, 2014 by Berto Monard.

SN 2014bu had magnitude about 15.5 and was located at RA 01h50m58.4s, DEC +22d00m00s, J2000.0. It was classified as type II-P supernova.

Image gallery

See also 
 List of NGC objects (1–1000)

References

External links 

 
 SEDS

Spiral galaxies
Aries (constellation)
694
6816
Astronomical objects discovered in 1861
Discoveries by Heinrich Louis d'Arrest